The Battle of Hadden Rig was a battle fought about three miles east of Kelso, in the Scottish Borders, between Scotland and England on 24 August 1542, during the reigns of King James V of Scotland and Henry VIII of England.  The English army was led by Robert Bowes, Deputy Warden of the English East March.  It was a significant Scottish victory, but it was overshadowed by the disastrous Scottish defeat at the Battle of Solway Moss in November.

"Roy depicts a small medieval settlement at Hadden surrounded by agricultural land but there is no reference to Haddon Rig.  However, it is named Crawford and Brooke's 1843 county map of Roxburghshire. The First Edition Ordnance Survey (1859) map depicts a woodland plantation Haddonrig Wood, within an area of land called Haddon Rig. To the west of Haddon rig wood is a small circular area of woodland named Jockscairn plantation, the naming of which may have some association with the battle, or its commemoration. Immediately to the south of Haddon Rig is the old Kelso to Wooler Road (currently the B6396), which also appears on Roy's map and, which may have been used by raiding forces."

Henry of England, being disgusted at his nephew's connections with France, and finding that Henry of England, Francis had sufficient employment at home, resolved to invade Scotland, both by sea and land. He, "appointed a very considerable army to rendezvous upon the borders, under the command of Sir Robert Bowes, one of his wardens, the Earl of Angus, and his brothers. James had nominated the Earl of Huntly to command his army on the borders, consisting of 10,000 men; and his lieutenant was Sir Walter Lindsay of Torphichen, who had seen a great deal of foreign service, and was esteemed an" excellent-officer. Huntly acquitted himself admirably Well in his commission, and was so well served by his spies, as to have certain intelligence that the English intended to surprise and burn Jedburgh and Kelso. The English army, under Bowes and the Doug lases, continued still on the borders; and the Scottish nobility and gentry had resolved "not to attack them on their own ground, nor to act offensively, unless their enemies invaded Scotland. Huntly being informed that the English had advanced, on the 24th of August, to a place called Haddonrig, and that they had destroyed a great part of" the Scottish and debatable lands, resolved to engage them; and the English were astonished when they saw the Scottish drawn up in order of battle about day-break. Neither party could now retreat without fighting; and Torphichen, who led the van, consisting of 2000 of the best troops of Scotland, charged the enemy so furiously, that Huntly gained a complete and easy victory. Above 2,000 of the English were killed, and 600 taken prisoner among whom were their General Bowes, Sir William Mowbray, and about sixty of the most distinguished northern barons; the Earl of Angus escaped by the swiftness of his horse. The loss of the Scottish was so inconsiderable that it is not mentioned.  

Haddon Rig is a large glacial ridge (rig) occupying gently sloping land between Sprouston and the River Tweed in the north, and Lempitlaw and the Cheviot Hills in the south. It is relatively flat on its summit which lies at around 160 m above sea level. The town of Kelso and settlement of Heiton lie 5 km to the west, and 7.5 km to the south-west respectively.

Legacy
The Haddon Rig sheep farm in New South Wales Australia is named for the Scottish battle site.

The Battle of Haddon Rig is commemorated in a composition for solo bagpipes composed by Clan Piper to Clan Davidson, Lindsay Davidson.

References

External links
article mainly about Solway Moss but mentions this battle

Haddon Rig
Haddon Rig
1542 in Scotland
History of the Scottish Borders
James V of Scotland
Haddon Rig
16th-century military history of Scotland